Episcopal area may refer to:

 Episcopal area (Anglicanism)
 Episcopal area (United Methodist Church)

See also
 Episcopal conference, Catholic conference of bishops